Brad Osgood is a Professor in the Stanford Department of Electrical Engineering, and, by courtesy, faculty in the Graduate School of Education.

Education
Brad Osgood completed his PhD in mathematics from the University of Michigan in 1980.
He joined the Stanford faculty in 1985.

Research and Academic Career
Dr. Osgood's research interests include math, technology and education.
Areas of specialization are complex analysis, differential geometry and signal processing. He is the author or co-author of several textbooks on calculus, applied calculus, and multivariable calculus.

Professor Osgood has worked to place STEM topics in front of a broader audience and elevate their accessibility. Serving as Senior Associate Dean for Student Affairs in the School of Engineering, (2000-2019) and on the Senate of the Academic Council (since 2012) to re-structure STEM curriculum to encourage non-technical students to explore new areas.

Awards and honors
 2014, Robert Bass University Fellows in Undergraduate Education Program
 1991, ASSU Teaching Award for classes with more than 30 students.

Books
 Osgood, B., "Lectures on the Fourier Transform and Its Applications", American Mathematical Society, 2019. 
 Osgood, B., et al., "Applied Calculus",  John Wiley & Sons, New York, 2006.
 Osgood, B., Gleason, A., Hallett, D. H., "Calculus", John Wiley & Sons, New York, 2005.
 Osgood, B., et al., "Single and Multivariable Calculus", John Wiley & Sons, New York, 2005.

External links
 Google Scholar, Brad Osgood
 Stanford profile, Brad Osgood

References

Stanford University Department of Electrical Engineering faculty
Living people
Stanford University School of Engineering faculty
Stanford University faculty
University of Michigan alumni
Year of birth missing (living people)